Walk the Line is a 2005 American biographical drama film directed by James Mangold. The screenplay, written by Mangold and Gill Dennis, is based on two autobiographies by the American singer-songwriter Johnny Cash:  Man in Black: His Own Story in His Own Words (1975) and Cash: The Autobiography (1997). The film follows Cash's early life, his romance with the singer June Carter, his ascent in the country music scene, and his  drug addiction. It stars Joaquin Phoenix as Cash, Reese Witherspoon as Carter, Ginnifer Goodwin as Cash's first wife Vivian Liberto, and Robert Patrick as Cash's father.

Walk the Line premiered at the Telluride Film Festival on September 4, 2005, and was theatrically released by  20th Century Fox on November 18. It received positive reviews and grossed $187 million on a $28 million budget. At the 78th Academy Awards the film won Best Actress (Witherspoon) and was also nominated for Best Actor (Phoenix), Best Sound, Best Costume Design, and Best Film Editing.

Plot

In 1968, as an audience of inmates at Folsom State Prison cheer for Johnny Cash, he waits backstage near a table saw, reminding him of his early life.

In 1944, 12-year-old Johnny is raised on a cotton farm in Dyess, Arkansas, with his brother Jack, abusive father Ray, and mother Carrie. One day, Jack is killed in a sawmill accident while Johnny is out fishing; Ray blames Johnny for Jack’s death, saying that the Devil "took the wrong son".

In 1950, Johnny enlists in the U.S. Air Force and is stationed in West Germany. He purchases a guitar, and in 1952, finds solace in writing songs, one of which he develops as "Folsom Prison Blues".

After his discharge in 1954, Cash returns to the United States and marries his girlfriend, Vivian Liberto. The couple moves to Memphis, Tennessee, where Cash works as a door-to-door salesman to support his growing family, but with little success. He walks past a recording studio, which inspires him to organize a band to play gospel music. Cash's band auditions for Sam Phillips, the owner of Sun Records. Phillips signs them after they play "Folsom Prison Blues", and the band begins touring as Johnny Cash and the Tennessee Two, alongside fellow rising stars Elvis Presley, Carl Perkins and Jerry Lee Lewis.

On tour, Johnny meets June Carter, with whom he falls in love. They become friends, but June gently rebuffs his attempts to woo her. As Johnny’s fame grows, he starts abusing drugs and alcohol.

Over Vivian's objections, Johnny persuades June to go tour with him. The tour is a success, but backstage, Vivian becomes critical of June's influence. After one performance in Las Vegas, Johnny and June sleep together. The next morning, she notices Johnny taking pills, and doubts her choices. At that evening's concert, Johnny, upset by June's apparent rejection, behaves erratically and eventually passes out on stage. June disposes of Johnny's drugs, and begins to write "Ring of Fire", describing her feelings for him and her pain at watching him descend into addiction.

Returning to California, Johnny travels to Mexico to purchase more drugs and is arrested. Johnny’s marriage to Vivian implodes; they divorce and he moves to Nashville in 1966. Trying to reconcile with June, Johnny purchases a large house near a lake in Hendersonville. His parents and the extended Carter family arrive for Thanksgiving, at which time Ray and an intoxicated Johnny get into a bitter argument. After the meal, June's mother encourages her daughter to help Cash. He goes into detox and wakes with June; she says they have been given a second chance. They begin a tentative relationship, but June rebuffs his marriage proposals.

Johnny discovers that most of his fan mail is from prisoners. He proposes to skeptical Columbia Records executives that he will record an album live inside Folsom Prison. The performance is a success, and Johnny embarks on a tour with June and his band. He later performs "Ring of Fire" on stage. After the song, Cash invites June to a duet and stops in the middle, saying he cannot sing "Jackson" any more unless June agrees to marry him. June accepts and they share a passionate embrace on stage. While  Johnny and June are with their families, he and his father reconcile their relationship.

Cast

 Joaquin Phoenix as Johnny Cash
 Reese Witherspoon as June Carter
 Ginnifer Goodwin as Vivian Cash
 Robert Patrick as Ray Cash
 McGhee Monteith as Reba Cash 
 Dallas Roberts as Sam Phillips
 Dan John Miller as Luther Perkins
 Larry Bagby as Marshall Grant
 Shelby Lynne as Carrie Cash
 Tyler Hilton as Elvis Presley
 Waylon Payne as Jerry Lee Lewis
 Shooter Jennings as Waylon Jennings
 Sandra Ellis Lafferty as Maybelle Carter
 Dan Beene as Ezra Carter
 Clay Steakley as W.S. "Fluke" Holland
 Johnathan Rice as Roy Orbison
 Johnny Holiday as Carl Perkins
 Ridge Canipe as young J.R.
 Lucas Till as young Jack Cash

Development and pre-production
The film has its origins in a 1993 episode of Dr. Quinn, Medicine Woman. That year, Cash was a guest star on the show, where he and June Carter became friends with Jane Seymour, the star of the show, and Seymour's ex-husband James Keach who was directing the episode. By the mid-1990s, Cash had asked Keach to make a film of his life; he and Seymour began the process with a series of interviews. In 1997, the interviews had been the basis of a screenplay written by Gill Dennis, with input from Keach; two years later, still lacking any studio interest, Keach contacted James Mangold, who had been "angling to become involved in the project for two years."  Mangold and his wife, producer Cathy Konrad, developed the script for Sony, and by 2001, they had a script they thought they could pitch to a studio. Sony and others turned it down, but Fox 2000 agreed to make the film.

The film was in part based on two autobiographies, both of which were optioned: Man in Black (1975) and Cash: The Autobiography (1997), though the film "burrows deep into painful territory that Mr. Cash barely explored."

Phoenix met Cash months before hearing about the film. When Phoenix read the script, he felt there were at least ten other actors who would be better in the role. All of Cash's vocal tracks in the film and on the accompanying soundtrack are played and sung by Phoenix. To prepare for her role as June Carter, Witherspoon studied videos of the singer; she also listened to her singing and telling stories to get her voice right.

Release

Walk the Line was released on November 18, 2005, in 2,961 theaters, grossing $22.3 million on its opening weekend behind Harry Potter and the Goblet of Fire. It went on to earn $119.5 million in North America and $66.9 million in the rest of the world for a total of $186.4 million, well above its $28 million budget, making it a box office success. It was the all-time highest grossing music biopic until Straight Outta Compton surpassed it in 2015.

Reception

Critical response

Walk the Line has an approval rating of 82% on the review aggregator website Rotten Tomatoes based on 210 reviews, with an average rating of 7.20/10. The website's critical consensus reads: "Superior acting and authentic crooning capture the emotional subtleties of the legend of Johnny Cash with a freshness that is a pleasure to watch."
Metacritic assigned the film a weighted average score of 72 out of 100, based on 39 critics, indicating "generally favorable reviews". Audiences polled by CinemaScore gave the film an average grade of "A" on an A+ to F scale.

Roger Ebert praised Witherspoon for her "boundless energy" and predicted that she would win the Academy Award for Best Actress. Regarding Phoenix, Ebert wrote: "Knowing Johnny Cash's albums more or less by heart, I closed my eyes to focus on the soundtrack and decided that, yes, that was the voice of Johnny Cash I was listening to. The closing credits make it clear it's Joaquin Phoenix doing the singing, and I was gob-smacked." In her review for the Los Angeles Times, Carina Chocano wrote: "Joaquin Phoenix and Reese Witherspoon do first-rate work they sing, they twang, they play new-to-them instruments, they crackle with wit and charisma, and they give off so much sexual heat it's a wonder they don't burst into flames."

A. O. Scott, in his review for The New York Times, had problems with Phoenix's performance: "Even though his singing voice doesn't match the original how could it? he is most convincing in concert, when his shoulders tighten and he cocks his head to one side. Otherwise, he seems stuck in the kind of off-the-rack psychological straitjacket in which Hollywood likes to confine troubled geniuses." In his review for Time, Richard Corliss wrote: "A lot of credit for Phoenix's performance has to go to Mangold, who has always been good at finding the bleak melodrama in taciturn souls ... If Mangold's new movie has a problem, it's that he and co-screenwriter Gill Dennis sometimes walk the lines of the inspirational biography too rigorously."

Andrew Sarris, in his review for The New York Observer, praised Witherspoon for her "spine-tingling feistiness", and wrote: "This feat has belatedly placed it (in my mind, at least) among a mere handful of more-than-Oscar-worthy performances this year." He also ranked the film as number seven on his top films list of 2005 and Witherspoon as the best female performance of the year. Owen Gleiberman of Entertainment Weekly gave the film a "B+" rating and wrote: "While Witherspoon, a fine singer herself, makes Carter immensely likable, a fountain of warmth and cheer, given how sweetly she meshes with Phoenix her romantic reticence isn't really filled in." The Baltimore Sun contributor Michael Sragow wrote: "What Phoenix and Witherspoon accomplish in this movie is transcendent. They act with every bone and inch of flesh and facial plane, and each tone and waver of their voice. They do their own singing with a startling mastery of country music's narrative musicianship." In his review for Sight & Sound, Mark Kermode wrote: "Standing ovations, too, for Witherspoon, who has perhaps the tougher task of lending depth and darkness to the role of June, whose frighteningly chipper stage act - a musical-comedy hybrid - constantly courts (but never marries) mockery." David Ansen of Newsweek ranked Witherspoon as one of the five best actresses of 2005.

Some critics found the film too constrained by Hollywood plot formulas of love and loss, ignoring the last twenty years of Cash's life and other more socio-politically controversial reasons he was considered "the man in black".

Cash's daughter, Rosanne Cash, had mixed feelings about the film. She did not enjoy the "painful" experience of seeing the film, "because it had the three most damaging events of my childhood: my parents' divorce, my father's drug addiction, and something else bad that I can't remember now". Regarding the work of the filmmakers, she said "the three of them [in the film] were not recognizable to me as my parents in any way. But the scenes were recognizable, and the storyline, so the whole thing was fraught with sadness because they all had just died, and I had this resistance to seeing the screen version of my childhood. I don't resent them making it - I thought it was an honorable approach. I loved the movie Ray, but I'm sure if you asked Ray Charles's kids, they would tell you, "Well, that's not exactly how it was..."

Accolades

Walk the Line won the Golden Globe Award for Best Motion Picture – Musical or Comedy and North Texas Film Critics Association Award for Best Picture.

For his portrayal of Johnny Cash, Phoenix won the Golden Globe Award for Best Actor – Motion Picture Musical or Comedy, Hollywood Film Award for Actor of the Year, and North Texas Film Critics Association Award for Best Actor. He also received nominations for the Academy Award for Best Actor, BAFTA Award for Best Actor in a Leading Role, Critics' Choice Movie Award for Best Actor, Satellite Award for Best Actor – Motion Picture Musical or Comedy, and Screen Actors Guild Award for Outstanding Performance by a Male Actor in a Leading Role, among others. For his involvement on the film's soundtrack, he won the Grammy Award for Best Compilation Soundtrack Album for Motion Picture, Television, or Other Visual Media, sharing the win with T Bone Burnett (producer) and Mike Piersante (engineer/mixer).

For her portrayal of June Carter, Witherspoon won the Academy Award for Best Actress, Austin Film Critics Association Award for Best Actress, Awards Circuit Community Award for Best Actress in a Leading Role, BAFTA Award for Best Actress in a Leading Role, Boston Society of Film Critics Award for Best Actress, Critics' Choice Movie Award for Best Actress, Florida Film Critics Circle Award for Best Actress, Golden Globe Award for Best Actress – Motion Picture Comedy or Musical, Kansas City Film Critics Circle Award for Best Actress, Las Vegas Film Critics Society Award for Best Actress, National Society of Film Critics Award for Best Actress, New York Film Critics Circle Award for Best Actress, North Texas Film Critics Association Award for Best Actress, Online Film & Television Association Award for Best Actress, Online Film Critics Society Award for Best Actress, San Francisco Bay Area Film Critics Circle Award for Best Actress, Satellite Award for Best Actress – Motion Picture Musical or Comedy, Screen Actors Guild Award for Outstanding Performance by a Female Actor in a Leading Role, Utah Film Critics Association Award for Best Actress, and Washington D.C. Area Film Critics Association Award for Best Actress. She was also voted Favorite Leading Actress at the 32nd People's Choice Awards.

The film was also nominated for the Academy Award for Best Costume Design, Best Film Editing, and Best Sound Mixing.

Home media
On February 28, 2006, a single-disc DVD and a two-disc collector edition DVD were released; these editions sold three million copies on their first day of release. On March 25, 2008, a two-disc 'extended cut' DVD was released for region one. The feature on disc one is 17 minutes longer than the theatrical release, and disc two features eight extended musical sequences with introductions and documentaries about the making of the film. The film has been released on Blu-ray Disc in France, Sweden and the UK in the form of its extended cut. The American Blu-ray features the shorter theatrical cut.

Soundtrack

Wind-up Records released the soundtrack in November 2005.  It featured nine songs performed by Joaquin Phoenix, four songs by Reese Witherspoon, two songs by Tyler Hilton, and one song each by Waylon Payne, Johnathan Rice, and Shooter Jennings.  The album received a Grammy at the 49th Annual Grammy Awards for Best Compilation Soundtrack Album for Motion Pictures, Television or Other Visual Media.

References

External links

 
 
 
 
 
 

20th Century Fox films
2005 films
American biographical drama films
Best Musical or Comedy Picture Golden Globe winners
Biographical films about musicians
Country music films
Films based on autobiographies
Films based on multiple works
Films directed by James Mangold
Films featuring a Best Actress Academy Award-winning performance
Films featuring a Best Musical or Comedy Actor Golden Globe winning performance
Films featuring a Best Musical or Comedy Actress Golden Globe winning performance
Films produced by Cathy Konrad
Films scored by T Bone Burnett
Films set in Arkansas
Films shot in Arkansas
Films set in Tennessee
Films set in California
Films set in the 1940s
Films set in the 1950s
Films set in the 1960s
Johnny Cash
Musical films based on actual events
American nonlinear narrative films
Films about drugs
Films set in Memphis, Tennessee
Films with screenplays by James Mangold
Rockabilly
Cultural depictions of Johnny Cash
2005 biographical drama films
BAFTA winners (films)
2005 drama films
2000s English-language films
2000s American films